The term "Two Chinas" refers to the geopolitical situation where two political entities exist under the name "China".

Background

In 1912, the Xuantong Emperor abdicated as a result of the Xinhai Revolution, and the Republic of China was established in Nanjing by revolutionaries under Sun Yat-sen. At the same time, the Beiyang government, led by Yuan Shikai, a former Qing dynasty general, existed in Beijing, whose legitimacy was challenged by the Nationalist government under the Kuomintang (Chinese Nationalist Party).

From 1912 to 1949, China was scarred by warlords, the Japanese invasion and the Chinese Civil War. Throughout this turbulent period, various multiple governments existed in China. These include Yuan Shikai's Beiyang government (1912–1928), the Chinese Soviet Republic (1931–1937) established by the Chinese Communist Party (CCP), the puppet states of Manchukuo (1932–1945) and Mengjiang (1939–1945), the Fujian People's Government (1933–1934), Wang Jingwei's Japanese-sponsored puppet government (1940–1945), Ganden Phodrang's Tibet (1912–1951), Khoja Niyaz's Turkic Islamic Republic of East Turkestan (1933–1934), the Soviet-backed East Turkestan Republic (1944–1949), the Tuvan People's Republic (1921–1944), Bogd Khan's Mongolian State in Outer Mongolia (1911–1924) and the Mongolian People's Republic (1924–1992), with the latter recognized by China in 1946.

As the Chinese Civil War ended in 1949, the Chinese communist People's Republic of China (PRC), led by CCP Chairman Mao Zedong, took control of Mainland China. The Republic of China, led by President Chiang Kai-shek, retreated the government of the Republic of China to the island of Taiwan, 

Though fighting continued for the next several years, by the time of the Korean War the lines of control were sharply drawn: the Communist-led People's Republic of China government in Beijing controlled most of mainland China, while the Kuomintang-led Republic of China government, now in Taipei, controlled the island of Taiwan, some surrounding islands, and a number of islands off the coast of Fujian. This stalemate was enforced with the assistance of the United States government that began deterring an invasion of Taiwan after the start of the Korean War.

For many years, both governments contended to be the sole legitimate government of China. With the fighting largely over, the major battleground became diplomatic. Before the 1970s, the Republic of China was still recognized by many countries and the United Nations as the sole legitimate government of "China", which claimed sovereignty over both mainland China and Taiwan. The Republic of China had been a founding member of the United Nations and was one of the five permanent members of the Security Council until 1971, when they were expelled from the UN and China's representation was replaced by the People's Republic of China (PRC) via UN General Assembly Resolution 2758. Before the 1970s, few foreign governments recognised the People's Republic of China. The first governments to recognise it as the government of "China" were Soviet bloc countries, members of the non-aligned movement, and the United Kingdom (1950). The catalyst to change came in 1971, when the United Nations General Assembly expelled representatives of Chiang Kai-shek by refusing to recognise their accreditations as representatives of China. Recognition for the People's Republic of China soon followed from most other governments, including the United States. The Republic of China continued to compete with the People's Republic of China (PRC) to be recognised as the legitimate government of China.

Since the 1990s, however, a rising movement for formal recognition of Taiwanese independence has made the political status of Taiwan the dominant issue, replacing the debate about the legitimate government of China. A view in Taiwan is that the Republic of China and the People's Republic of China are both sovereign, thus forming "two Chinas", or "one China, one Taiwan". Former Republic of China President Chen Shui-bian adamantly supported this status quo, and accordingly largely abandoned the campaign for the Republic of China to be recognised as the sole legitimate government of China. Under President Chen, the ROC government was campaigning for the Republic of China to join the United Nations as representative of its effective territory—Taiwan and nearby islands—only. Chen's successor, President Ma Ying-jeou, ceased that push.

Current situation

In the past, both the People's Republic of China (PRC) and the Republic of China (ROC) have claimed de jure sovereignty over all of China whilst denying the legitimacy of the other. The position of the PRC and the Pan-Blue Coalition of the ROC remains that there is only one sovereign entity of China, and that each of them represents the legitimate government of all of China—including both mainland China and Taiwan—and the other is illegitimate. The position of the Pan-Green Coalition of the ROC is that Taiwan is an independent sovereign state named "Republic of China", and Taiwan is not part of "China".

People's Republic of China
The government of the People's Republic of China (PRC) opposes treating the Republic of China (ROC) as a legitimate state and portrays Taiwan as a rogue province of the PRC. The People's Republic of China government has consistently opposed "two Chinas", instead espousing that all of "China" is under one single, indivisible sovereignty under its "One China Principle", explicitly including Taiwan. Under this principle, while the PRC has no de facto control over territory administered by the ROC, the PRC nevertheless claims that the territories controlled by both the PRC and ROC are part of the same, indivisible sovereign entity "China".

PRC government policy mandates that any country that wishes to establish a diplomatic relationship with the PRC must first discontinue any formal relationship with the ROC. According to The Fletcher Forum of World Affairs, "non-recognition of the Taiwanese government is a prerequisite for conducting formal diplomatic relations with the PRCin effect forcing other governments to choose between Beijing and Taipei." In order to compete for other countries' recognition, each government has given money to certain small countries. Several small African and Caribbean countries have established and discontinued diplomatic relationships with both sides several times in exchange for huge financial support from each side. The PRC also uses its international influence to prohibit the ROC from entering international events such as the Olympic Games under its official name. Instead, the ROC was forced to adopt the name Chinese Taipei to enter such events since the 1980s. Furthermore, on press releases and other media, the PRC never refers to the ROC as such, instead referring to the territory of Taiwan as "China's Taiwan Province", and to the ROC government as "the Taiwan authority".

Republic of China

Until the constitutional reforms of 1991, the Republic of China (ROC) actively asserted its claim of sovereignty over all of China and still opposes treating the People's Republic of China (PRC) as a legitimate state. ROC authorities clarified the constitutional reforms by stating they do not "dispute the fact that the PRC controls mainland China."  Since then, the ROC has neither actively asserted these claims nor denied them.  Democratization and liberalization of free speech has led to the emergence of the Taiwan independence movement, which is opposed to the idea of "Two Chinas".  The ROC's position with respect to "Two Chinas" has varied by administration, with Pan-Blue administrations favoring it and Pan-Green administrations moving away from it.

In 1999, then President Lee Teng-hui defined the relationship as "Special state-to-state relations".  

President Chen Shui-bian declared in 2002 that "with Taiwan and China on each side of the Taiwan Strait, each side is a country".  In 2003 he explained that "Taiwan is not a province of one country nor is it a state of another". The Chen administration took steps to use the name "Taiwan" internationally to prevent confusion between the "two Chinas", such as placing the word "Taiwan" underneath "Republic of China" on Republic of China passports.

In September 2008 President Ma Ying-jeou from the Kuomintang stated that the relations between the ROC and the PRC are neither between two Chinas nor two states, saying instead that it is a "special relationship". Further, he stated that the sovereignty issues between the two cannot be resolved at present, but he quoted the 1992 Consensus as a temporary measure until a solution becomes available. The spokesman for the ROC Presidential Office Wang Yu-chi later clarified the President's statement and said that the relations are between two regions of one country, based on the ROC Constitutional position, the Statute Governing the Relations Between the Peoples of the Taiwan Area and Mainland Area and the 1992 Consensus.

President Tsai Ing-wen of the Democratic Progressive Party was elected in 2016 and has refused to recognize the 1992 Consensus.  Under the Tsai administration, the English words "Republic of China" were removed from Taiwanese passports, though the corresponding Chinese characters remained.

See also 
One China
Greater China
Cross-strait relations
Chinese unification
Taiwanese independence

Notes

References 

Cross-Strait relations